Peter Humphries Clark (March 29, 1829 – June 21, 1925) was an American abolitionist and speaker. One of Ohio's most effective black abolitionist writers and speakers, he became the first teacher engaged by the Cincinnati black public schools in 1849, and the founder and principal of Ohio's first public high school for black students in 1866. Because of these accomplishments, he was named the nation's primary black public school educator. Clark is also remembered as the first African-American socialist in the United States, running for Congress in 1878 under the banner of the Socialist Labor Party of America.

Biography

Early years
Peter Humphries Clark was born March 29, 1829 in Cincinnati, Ohio.

Peter's father, Michael Clark, was a successful barber and sent his son to private schools because of the absence of public schools. After his father's death in 1849, Peter took over the barber shop for a short time. Later that same year black schools were authorized by the Ohio legislature. This was largely due to the efforts of Peter's uncle, John Isom Gaines. Peter became the first teacher in the black school. He was fired in 1853 by the white Board of Education for publicly praising Thomas Paine.

He attended the private Gilmore High School. Later in his life he received a masters (A.M.) degree from Wilberforce University.

Career

During the next four years, Peter was an abolitionist publisher, editor, writer, and speaker. He participated in the Ohio Conventions of Colored Men, and edited and published his own weekly newspaper. He was appointed secretary of the 1853 National Convention of Colored Men in Syracuse, New York, by Frederick Douglass, where he drafted a constitution of the National Equal Rights League. He also served as a conductor for the Underground Railroad. In 1854 he married Francis Ann Williams.

In 1855 he formed the journal, Herald of Freedom, which quickly failed. He then became editor of a Free-soil Party journal published in Newport, Kentucky owned by William S. Bailey. In 1856 he was on the staff of  Frederick Douglass' Paper. In 1857 he was rehired by the black trustees of the colored schools and made principal of the Western District School in Cincinnati. Whilst in Cincinnati he founded a union for black teachers.

He became principal of Gaines High School in 1866 and held that post until 1886, when he was fired on political grounds. He left Cincinnati in 1887 to serve as principal of the Alabama State normal and Industrial School, and in 1888 went to St. Louis where he taught at the segregated Sumner High School for twenty years.

Political activity

He was an abolitionist. In the first fugitive slave case in Ohio in 1853, George Washington McQuerry was taken into custody by men claiming he was an escaped slave. Clark was able to obtain a writ of habeas corpus from Judge John McLean so the case could go before the court. The case was unsuccessful and McQuerry was forced back into slavery.

He was a member of the Republican Party from about 1856 to 1872 but left the party. In 1876 he joined the Workingmen's Party of the United States, the forerunner to the Socialist Labor Party of America, shortly after the Party's foundation. The following year he spoke to a crowd of thousands in Cincinnati in support of strikers in the Great Railroad Strike, denouncing the repression of the strikers by the state. The speech was decried by the local press, but was warmly received by socialists, and Clark ran as a Workingmen's Party candidate for state school commissioner the same year, becoming the first black socialist to run for office in the United States: he was not elected, but won about 8,000 votes. In 1878 he ran for congress on the Workingmen's Party ticket, one of the party's first congressional candidates. He ran in Ohio's 1st congressional district, garnering 275 votes, or 1.09%. He left the SLP in 1879 declaring "“The welfare of the Negro is my controlling political motive”, but doubting that the SLP shared this viewpoint. In 1882, he aided county Democrats in organizing a civil rights bill, which passed into law.

Death and legacy
Clark had three children, daughters Ernestine and Consuelo, and son Herbert. Consuelo was a doctor and graduated from the School of Medicine at Boston University.

Clark died on June 21, 1925.

Works
 Black Brigade of Cincinnati: Being a Report of Its Labors and a Muster-Roll of Its Members etc.  [1864] Ohio Historical Society.
 "Socialism:The Remedy for the Evils of Society,” 1877.

See also
 List of African-American abolitionists

References

Further reading
 Philip S. Foner, "American Socialism and Black Americans: From the Age of Jackson to World War II", The Journal of Negro History, Vol. 63, No. 3 (Jul., 1978), pp. 253–257.
 Walter Herz, "Peter H. Clark". Unitarian Universalist Historical Society, 1999.
 J. Reuben Sheeler, "The Struggle of the Negro in Ohio for Freedom", The Journal of Negro History, Vol. 31, No. 2 (April 1946), pp. 208–226.
 Nikki M. Taylor, America's First Black Socialist: The Radical Life of Peter H. Clark. Lexington, KY: University Press of Kentucky, 2013.

External links
 Peter H. Clark, Unitarian Universalist Historical Society

American socialists
1829 births
1925 deaths
Writers from Cincinnati
African-American abolitionists
American Unitarians
Socialist Labor Party of America politicians
Activists from Ohio
Missouri socialists
Ohio socialists
Ohio Republicans
Alabama Republicans
Missouri Republicans
20th-century African-American people